The second inauguration of Juan Manuel Santos as the 32rd President of Colombia marked the beginning of his second term in the house of Nariño as head of state for Juan Manuel Santos, being the fifth president of Colombia to be re-elected and the second in a row, for this time his vice-presidential formula fell to the former interior minister and former finance minister Germán Vargas Lleras, who was sworn in as the 10th Vice President.

The event was the 45th presidential inauguration. Held in Bogotá, D.C., starting on August 7, 2014, the inaugural events included concerts and cultural demonstrations, in celebration of the peace agreements that the already re-elected government was planning.

Ceremony
The ceremony began as usual at 2:00 in the afternoon, the staging occurred when President Juan Manuel Santos in the company of his wife María Clemencia and their children Martín María Antonia and Esteban walked the nearly one hundred meters that separate the Casa de Nariño, from the Patio Núñez on the occasion of the commemoration of the 200 years of independence the ceremony took place in the patio de nuñes of the congress of the republic and not in the central area as is customary to do.

Pre-inaugural events
Within the pre-opening events, an indigenous ceremony was held in the Sierra Nevada de Santa Marta as a prelude to the act of inauguration that same day in which he will become the fifty-ninth head of state in the country's history, Santos He traveled with his wife and children to receive a baton from the wise men of the Kogui, Wiwa, Arhuaco and Kankuamo ethnic groups, who inhabit the Sierra Nevada de Santa Marta.

See also
 2014 Colombian presidential election
 Juan Manuel Santos
 Germán Vargas Lleras
 Inauguration of Iván Duque

References

Santos, Juan Manuel
2014 in Colombia
2014 in politics
August 2014 events in South America